The Collaborative Summer Library Program (CSLP) is a nonprofit, charitable organization that supports literacy, education and science through summer reading events in public libraries across the United States.

History 
CSLP began in 1987 with ten Minnesota regional library systems that joined together to create a theme, artwork and program ideas for libraries to use for children's programming. It subsequently expanded to libraries throughout all fifty states and Washington D.C. to ensure all libraries can provide a high quality summer reading program. As of 2019, more than 4,800 libraries were participants.

References

External links
 CSLP home page

Libraries in the United States
Public libraries
Educational organizations based in the United States